Hannon (formerly called Barton City) is an unincorporated community in Barton County, in the U.S. state of Missouri.

History
A post office called Hannon was established in 1890, and remained in operation until 1953. The community most likely was named after the local Hannon family.

References

Unincorporated communities in Barton County, Missouri
Unincorporated communities in Missouri